Ta-hsopteng or Tahsopteng   is a river village on the Salween River in Langhko Township, Langhko District, in the Shan State of eastern Burma. It lies on the confluence of the Salween and the Teng River.

The village is located northwest of the Burma-Thailand border village of Wān Na-mon.

References

External links
Maplandia World Gazetteer

Populated places in Langhko District
Langhko Township
Communities on the Salween River